Hossein Nassehi was a Persian composer and trombone player.

Biography
Nassehi was born in Tehran and studied Trombone at the Tehran Conservatory and composition at the Ankara State Conservatory. For many years he was a professor at the Tehran Conservatory; Hossein Dehlavi, Ahmad Pejman and Parviz Mansouri were among his pupils.

Most of Nassehi's works were never performed in Iran during the time of the Shah due to his political activities. He died of a heart attack in Tehran in 1977.

Nassehi's son Fereydoun is a pianist, and his daughter Nasrin is a member of the Tehran Symphony choir.

Works
 "Dance at the Court of King Samangan" (for soprano & orchestra)
 "Shour" for cello and piano
 "Hermaan" for voice and piano
 "String Quartet in E Minor"

References 
 "A Young Persian Composer; Hossein Nassehi", Music Review Journal, Tehran, 1939.
 Rahnama, Farideh. "A Tribute to Hossein Nassehi". Negin Monthly, No. 157, April 1978.
 Akbarzadeh, Pejman. "Persian Musicians" (Vol. 1). Navid Publications, Shiraz, 1999.

External Link
 Dance at the Court of Samangan (for voice & piano), performed by Evlin Baghcheban (audio)

Iranian composers
1977 deaths
Year of birth missing